Đorđe Dabić (born 1991) is a politician in Serbia. He was elected to the National Assembly of Serbia in the 2020 parliamentary election as a member of the Serbian Progressive Party.

Private career
Dabić holds a Bachelor of Laws degree from the University of Belgrade.

Politician

Municipal politics
Dabić received the fourth position on the Progressive Party's electoral list for the Čajetina municipal assembly in the 2016 Serbian local elections and was elected when the list won seven mandates. The election was won by the Democratic Party of Serbia and its allies, and Dabić served in opposition for the next four years. He was given the third position on the Progressive list for the 2020 local elections and was re-elected when the list won eight mandates. This election was won by Healthy Serbia and its allies. Dabić continues to serve in opposition at the municipal level.

He has participated in the Progressive Party's Academy of Young Leaders program and served as commissioner of the party's municipal board in Čajetina.

Parliamentarian
Dabič received the seventh position on the Progressive Party's Aleksandar Vučić — For Our Children list for the 2020 Serbian parliamentary election. This was tantamount to election, and he was indeed elected to the assembly when the list won a landslide majority with 188 mandates. He is a member of the assembly committee on the judiciary, public administration, and local self-government; a deputy member of the committee on the diaspora and Serbs in the region and the committee on Kosovo–Metohija; a deputy member of the European Union–Serbia committee on stabilization and association; the leader of Serbia's parliamentary friendship group with Zimbabwe; and a member of the parliamentary friendship groups with the Bahamas, Bosnia and Herzegovina, Botswana, Cameroon, the Central African Republic, Comoros, the Dominican Republic, Ecuador, Equatorial Guinea, Eritrea, Grenada, Guinea-Bissau, Jamaica, Kyrgyzstan, Montenegro, Kyrgyzstan, Laos, Liberia, Madagascar, Mali, Mauritius, Mozambique, Nauru, Nicaragua, Nigeria, Palau, Papua New Guinea, Paraguay, the Republic of Congo, Saint Vincent and the Grenadines, Sao Tome and Principe, the Solomon Islands, Sri Lanka, Sudan, Suriname, Togo, Trinidad and Tobago, Uruguay, and Uzbekistan.

References

1991 births
Living people
People from Čajetina
Members of the National Assembly (Serbia)
Serbian Progressive Party politicians